This is a list of film remakes. Excluded are films based on the same source material. For example, the 1962 version of Mutiny on the Bounty is not a remake of the 1935 film; both are based on the novel Mutiny on the Bounty. Reboots are also omitted.

This list is ordered by the title of the original film, inasmuch as there can be multiple remakes.

N

O

P

Q

R

S

T

U

V

W

X

Y

Z

See also
 List of film remakes (A–M)
 List of English-language films with previous foreign-language film versions
 List of American television series based on British television series

References 

Lists of film remakes